The Cuba national U-17 football team represents Cuba in tournaments and friendly matches at the under-17 level and is controlled by the Asociación de Fútbol de Cuba.

2011 CONCACAF U-17 Championship qualification

Group A - final round

Fixtures and results

Competitive record

FIFA U-16/17 World Cup record

CONCACAF U-16/U-17 Championship record
 1983: Did not enter
 1985: Did not enter
 1987: Did not enter
 1988: Champions
 1991: Third place
 1992: Fourth place
 1994: Did not enter
 1996: Did not enter
 1999: Did not enter
 2001: Did not qualify
 2003: Fourth place Group B
 2005: Third place Group A
 2007: Did not qualify
 2009: Third place Group A (tournament interrupted)
 2011: Group stage
 2013: Group stage
 2015: Group stage
 2017: Classification stage
 2019: Did not enter
 2023: Round of 16
 From 1983 until 1991, competition was U-16, not U-17
 In 2009, the tournament was interrupted due to the swine flu.

Current players
The following players have been called up to participate in the 2013 CONCACAF U-17 Championship.

Current squad

Honours
CONCACAF Under-17 Championship
 Winners (1): 1988

See also
Cuba national football team
Cuba national under-20 football team

References

Caribbean national under-17 association football teams
u17
Football